"Without You" is a song written and sung by Johnny Tillotson, which he released in 1961. The song spent 13 weeks on the Billboard Hot 100 chart peaking at No. 7, while reaching No. 15 on Canada's CHUM Hit Parade, and No. 5 in Hong Kong.

The song was ranked No. 37 on Billboards end of year "Hot 100 for 1961 - Top Sides of the Year".

Chart performance

References

1961 songs
1961 singles
Johnny Tillotson songs
Songs written by Johnny Tillotson
Cadence Records singles